Ivanic may refer to:

People
 Ivanić, a Serbian and Croatian surname
 Ivanics, a Hungarian surname

Places
 Ivanić-Grad, a town in Moslavina, Zagreb County, Croatia
 Kloštar Ivanić, a municipality in Croatia

See also
 Ivanovic (surname)
 Ivan